Marco Imperial Gumabao (born August 14, 1994) is a Filipino actor, model, athlete, and entrepreneur.

He is the face—and body—of Philippine-based international clothing brand BENCH's underwear and swimwear collection for men, under BENCH/Body, for the company's spring-summer campaigns from 2017 to present.

Early life and education
Marco, born August 14, 1994 in Makati, Metro Manila, the Philippines, is the fourth of five children to actor and politician Dennis Roldan and former It Girl Loli Imperial-Gumabao. He also has three half-siblings. Growing up, he competed in Muay Thai.

Gumabao attended the Ateneo de Manila High School and then De La Salle University as a psychology major.

Acting career
He first appeared in an uncredited role in Toda Max (2012), then rose in popularity in the TV series Luv U, both in the same period (2012–2016).

Gumabao also starred in supporting roles in numerous films such as She's Dating the Gangster (2014), Just the Way You Are (2015), and several other projects. He had special participation in popular television series Forevermore (2014–15), Pusong Ligaw (2017–18), and Ang Probinsyano (2017).

In 2017, Gumabao left Star Magic agency after five years of being under their management, and signed a new contract with Viva Artists Agency on September 4, 2018, together with his siblings Michele Gumabao and Kat Gumabao. He announced his freelance status after making an appearance in GMA News and Public Affairs' public service anthology series, Wish Ko Lang!, but is mostly on ABS-CBN.

After being launched in his first major lead role in Para sa Broken Hearted (2018), he also starred in hit TV series Precious Hearts Romances Presents: Los Bastardos.

Following a supporting role in the 2018 Metro Manila Film Festival entry Aurora, he appeared in the film Ulan in 2019.

Modeling career
In 2017, Gumabao was announced as lead model for BENCH/Body. His underwear endorsements, commercials, and campaigns under BENCH revamped his image as a sexy and bankable actor and talent.

Since then, he has appeared in various magazines and publications, including Garage Magazine’s June–July 2018 Body Issue. He was also awarded the 2018 MEGA Man Best Bodies.

Filmography

References

External links 
 
 

1994 births
ABS-CBN personalities
Filipino male child actors
Living people
Star Magic
Viva Artists Agency
Filipino male film actors
Filipino male television actors
Male actors from Metro Manila
Filipino male models